Bosnian root music (izvorna bosanska muzika/изворна босанска музика) is polyphonic type of singing. It is the most popular form of rural music in Bosnia and Herzegovina. The singers are usually followed by violin, dvojnice and šargija.  It is connected to ganga and ravne pjesme, which are also characteristic for Bosnia and Herzegovina. The origin of the music is unknown, but some characteristics, like different temperament from the standard music, suggest it is an old type of music.

Songs
The songs are about all kinds of things from being a "lola" and "baraba", about love of a woman, having a good life, but also about sad things like mostly the war in Bosnia, or the nostalgia that expatriates experience about their home country. More recently Bosnian root music has - in a humorous way - concentrated on some facets of the modern way of life, like the widespread use of Facebook and smartphones.

Bosnian Root Music groups and singers
Some well-known Bosnian root groups currently would be Sateliti, Raspjevani Meraklije, Marko and Ilija Begic,DiciMai and CrissMate, and many others. The music has proven to be a way for former enemies to become friends again. Root music is popular among Serbs from the areas in and surrounding Ozren, Croats from Usora, Žepče and Posavina and even Bosniaks from Podrinje

Style
Bosnian root music is a polyphonic, or more commonly heterophonic music, which is usually sung by two singers. The first singer starts the song, and after some number of syllables the other joins in. Intervals used in this type of singing are minor and major second, which is characteristic for most of the Bosnian and Herzegovinian music, and some parts of Croatia. Range of the songs is usually very narrow, consisting of only few tones. The two singers differ in the use of ornaments, so usually the first one who started the song uses vibrato and trill while he is singing alone, and when the other joins in he uses no ornaments, while the other uses a lot of trill, which are produced from throat giving the overall performance its characteristic detuned nature.

Bosnia and Herzegovina culture
Bosnia and Herzegovina music